Esther Meir-Glitzenstein (born 1954, Israel) is a professor at the Ben-Gurion University of the Negev. She specializes in the history of Jews from Arab countries, especially Iraq and Yemen, in the 20th century.

Books 
 Zionism and the Jews of Iraq, 1941-1950, Tel-Aviv: Tel Aviv University and Am-Oved Publishers, 1993. 328 pp.
 Zionism in an Arab Country: Jews in Iraq in the 1940s, London and New York: Routledge, 2004. 285 pp. Book Cover
 Between Baghdad and Ramat-Gan: Iraqi Jews in Israel, Jerusalem: Yad Ben Zvi Publishers, 2009. 420 pp.
 The Exodus of the Yemenite Jews: Failed Operation and Formative Myth , Resling Publishers, Tel Aviv 2012. 340 pp.
 The “Magic Carpet” Exodus of Yemenite Jewry: An Israeli Formative Myth, Sussex Academic Press, 2014. 256 pp.
 Beer Sheva: Metropolis in the Making, Beer Sheva: Ben Gurion University Publishers, 2008. 333 pp.
 Development Towns in Israel, Jerusalem: Yad Ben Zvi Publishers, 2009. 449 pp.

References 

1954 births
Living people
Israeli historians
Israeli women historians
Academic staff of Ben-Gurion University of the Negev
Israeli women non-fiction writers